Ondrej Elexa (born 7 October 2000) is a Slovak footballer who plays for Partizán Bardejov as a centre-back.

Club career

FC Nitra
Elexa made his professional Fortuna Liga debut for Nitra against Spartak Trnava on 4 August 2019. Elexa was fielded as a center-back in the starting line-up, but was replaced by Marek Fábry after about an hour of play, as Nitra was one goal down. The final score was 2-0 for Trnava.

FC Košice
On 29 July 2020, Elexa returned to his hometown of Košice where he joined a second division club FC Košice - an unofficial successors to his youth club VSS Košice.

References

External links
 Futbalnet profile 
 
 

2000 births
Living people
Slovak footballers
Association football defenders
FC Nitra players
FC Košice (2018) players
1. FC Tatran Prešov players
Partizán Bardejov players
Slovak Super Liga players
2. Liga (Slovakia) players
3. Liga (Slovakia) players
Sportspeople from Košice